Barbara Monk Feldman is a Canadian composer. She was born in 1953, in Montreal, Quebec, Canada.

Education 
She studied composition with Bengt Hambraeus at McGill University from 1980 to 1983 where she achieved her MMus and then at the Hochschule für Musik Freiburg, Germany. Following this, she earned her PhD at the University at Buffalo, The State University of New York from 1984 to 1987 supported by the Edgard Varèse Fellowship. In Buffalo, she studied with the composer Morton Feldman, who she married in 1987 just prior to his death from pancreatic cancer.

Works 
Monk Feldman is fascinated by the relationship between sound and silence. She has written that she sees this relationship as 'about an inside and an outside for art itself, and how ephemeral that is. For example, an unexpected moment in the sculpture of Giacometti, where it's as though you suddenly have a brief glimpse into infinity. Or where in Cézanne you have an equally unpredictable experience in a fleeting recognition of something transient in the landscape. These moments are like a kind of recognition – and ironically, they include something that seems to come to us from the inside'.

Stage 

 Pyramus and Thisbe (2010)
 Io and Prometheus (2019)

Orchestra 

 Design for String Orchestra (1980)
 The Northern Shore for Percussion, Piano and Chamber Orchestra (2018)

Chamber 

 Movement for Solo Viola (1979)
 Trio for Violin, Cello and Piano (1984)
 Variations for Six String Instruments (1986)
 Two Flutes and Vibraphone (1987)
 Duo for Piano and Percussion (1988)
 The Immutable Silence (1990)
 Pure Difference (1990)
 Shadow (1991)
 Three Clarinets and Percussion (1994)
 Verses for Metal, Wood and Drums (1994)
 Verses for Five (1996)
 The Northern Shore (1997)
 Verses for Vibraphone (1997)
 Pour un nuage violet (1998)
 Proche et lointaine...la femme (2001)
 Glockenspiel (2004)
 The Loons of Black Sturgeon Lake (2004)
 String Quartet, 'Desert-Scape''' (2004)
 The Chaco Wilderness (2005)
 The Pale Blue Northern Sky (2007)
 Landscape Near La Pocatière, Québec (2007)
 A Veil for Time (2020)

 Choral 

 Variations for String Quartet and Chorus (1987)
 Infinite Other (1992)
 Poems by Gerard Manley Hopkins, I, II (2014)

 Vocal 

 The Gentlest Chord (1991)
 Three Poems by Wallace Stevens (1997)
 The Love Shards of Sappho'' (2001)

Selected Discography 

 Strings, Keyboard, Percussion, Voices, Horn (2008)
 Barbara Monk Feldman: The Northern Shore; Aki Takahashi, Sabat/Clarke, Dirk Rothbrust (2012)
 Barbara Monk Feldman: Soft Horizons; Aki Takahashi, FLUX Quartet, The DownTown Ensemble (2015)
 'Verses'; GBSR Duo (Siwan Rhys & George Barton) with Mira Benjamin (2021)

Notes 

McGill University School of Music alumni
Living people
1953 births
Musicians from Montreal
Hochschule für Musik Freiburg alumni
University at Buffalo alumni
20th-century Canadian composers
21st-century Canadian composers
Canadian women composers